Hibbertia is a genus of trilobites. A new species, H. aodiensis, was described from the late Ordovician of China by Dong-Chan Lee in 2012.

References

Harpetida
Ordovician trilobites of Asia